Verónica Sada Pérez (born 31 August 1963) is a Mexican politician affiliated with the PAN. As of 2013 she served as Deputy of the LXII Legislature of the Mexican Congress representing Nuevo León.

References

1963 births
Living people
Politicians from Monterrey
Women members of the Chamber of Deputies (Mexico)
National Action Party (Mexico) politicians
21st-century Mexican politicians
21st-century Mexican women politicians
Monterrey Institute of Technology and Higher Education alumni
Deputies of the LXII Legislature of Mexico
Members of the Chamber of Deputies (Mexico) for Nuevo León